The Administration of the President of the Republic of Belarus is a state administration body of Belarus that supervises the implementation of the resolutions of the President of Belarus.

Functions
The Presidential Administration has been created following a constitutional reform and the first presidential election in Belarus held in 1994. Alexander Lukashenko has been occupying the post as President of Belarus ever since. He has been accused of installing an authoritarian regime in Belarus. No other presidential elections in the country have been considered free and fair by the United States and the European Union.

The Administration of the President plays a key role in the Belarusian authoritarian system of state governance. The administration organizes the interaction between the President and legislative, executive and judicial bodies, local authorities, and mass media; provides analytical support to the President of Belarus. It drafts presidential decisions and legislation that is subsequently formally approved by the Parliament of Belarus.

Current leadership
 Igor Sergeenko, Head of the Presidential Administration
 Maxim Ryzhenkov, First Deputy Head of the Presidential Administration
Nikolai Snopkov, Deputy Head of the Presidential Administration
Andrei Kuntsevich, Deputy Head of the Presidential Administration

Accusations

Given the strategic importance of the Presidential Administration in the Belarusian system of power, senior officials of the administration of President Lukashenko have been accused by the United States and the European Union of orchestrating state propaganda that has been justifying political repressions and electoral fraud.

After the presidential elections of 2006 and 2010 top officials from the Presidential Administration have been included in EU and US sanctions lists and thereby made subject to travel bans and asset freeze.

Officials of the Presidential Administration sanctioned by the US and EU

United States sanctions list
 Natalia Petkevich, First Deputy Head of the Administration of the President of Belarus in 2004–2010
 Alexander Radkov, Former Minister of Education, then leader of the Belaya Rus movement and Deputy Head of the Presidential Administration
 Vladimir Rusakevich, Deputy Head of the Presidential Administration

EU sanctions list following the 2006 Belarusian presidential election
 Gennady Nevyglas, Head of the Presidential Administration
 Natalia Petkevich, Deputy Head of the Presidential Administration
 Anatoly Rubinov, Deputy Head of the Presidential Administration in charge of media and ideology
 Oleg Proleskovsky, Head of the Main Ideological department at the Presidential Administration

EU sanctions list following the 2010 Belarusian presidential election

 Vsevolod Yanchevski, Head of the Ideological Department of the Presidential Administration and Assistant to the President
 Oleg Proleskovsky, former Deputy Head of the Presidential Administration, former Head of General Directorate for Ideology and Centre of Analysis and Information
 Anatoli Rubinov, former Deputy Head of the Presidential Administration in charge of Media and Ideology (in 2006–2008)
 Aleksandr Bazanov, Director of the Information and Analytical Centre of the Presidential Administration
 Pavel Yakubovich, Editor-in-Chief of Sovetskaya Belorussiya – Belarus' Segodnya, the official newspaper of the Presidential Administration
 Vadzim Hihin, Editor-in-Chief of Belaruskaya Dumka, a monthly journal of the Presidential Administration
 Aleksei Gusev, former First Deputy Director of the Information and Analytical Centre of the Presidential Administration
 Alena Kolas, Deputy Director of the Information and Analytical Centre of the Presidential Administration
 Lev Krishtapovich, Deputy Director of the Information and Analytical Centre of the Presidential Administration

Remaining EU sanctions list after 2016

 Viktor Sheiman, Head of the Management Department of the Presidential Administration. Accused of being responsible for the unresolved disappearances of opposition leaders Yuri Zakharenko, Viktor Gonchar, opposition sponsor Anatoly Krasovski, and journalist Dmitri Zavadski in 1999–2000. Also included in EU's previous lists.
 Yuri Sivakov, former Deputy Head of the Presidential Administration. Accused of having orchestrated the unresolved disappearances of Yuri Zakharenko, Viktor Gonchar, Anatoly Krasovski and Dmitri Zavadski in 1999–2000. Also included in EU's previous lists.

Former staff
Ural Latypov, Bashkortostan-born KGB officer, later foreign minister of Belarus, head of the Presidential Administration in 2001-2004

References